Coleophora dianthi is a moth of the family Coleophoridae. It is found in most of Europe, Russia, Turkey and Iraq.

The wingspan is about 13.5 mm.

The larvae feed on Dianthus cartusianorum. They feed on the generative organs of their host plant.

References

dianthi
Moths described in 1855
Moths of Europe
Moths of Asia